Johannes Lavik (1 February 1856, Vaksdal – 14 February 1929) was a Norwegian journalist and newspaper editor. He was a subeditor of the newspaper Bergens Tidende from 1894. He was a founder and editor of the Nynorsk newspaper Gula Tidend from 1904. He edited Bondebladet from 1919 to 1925.

Johannes Lavik was a brother of Member of Parliament Andreas Lavik and actor Dore Lavik.

References

1856 births
1929 deaths
People from Vaksdal
Norwegian newspaper editors